William Douglas may refer to:

Earls

of Douglas
William Douglas, 1st Earl of Douglas (c. 1327–1384), Scottish magnate
William Douglas, 6th Earl of Douglas (c. 1424–1440), Scottish nobleman
William Douglas, 8th Earl of Douglas (1425–1452), Scottish nobleman

of Angus
William Douglas, 2nd Earl of Angus (c. 1398–1437), Scottish nobleman and soldier
William Douglas, 9th Earl of Angus (died 1591), Scottish nobleman and supporter of Mary, Queen of Scots
William Douglas, 10th Earl of Angus (1552–1611), Scottish nobleman
William Douglas, 1st Marquess of Douglas and 11th Earl of Angus (1589–1660), Scottish nobleman

of Morton
William Douglas, 6th Earl of Morton (c. 1540–1606), Scottish nobleman
William Douglas, 7th Earl of Morton (1582–1648), Scottish nobleman

Lords of Douglas
William I, Lord of Douglas (died c. 1214), medieval nobleman of Flemish origin
William Longleg, Lord of Douglas (c. 1220–c. 1274), Scoto-Norman nobleman
William the Hardy, Lord of Douglas (died c. 1298), Scottish soldier and governor of Berwick Castle
William IV, Lord of Douglas (died 1333), Scottish nobleman

Other nobles
William Douglas, Lord of Liddesdale (c. 1300–1353), Scottish nobleman and soldier
Sir William Douglas of Nithsdale (c. 1370–c. 1392), Scottish knight
William Douglas of Drumlanrig (died 1427)
William Douglas of Glenbervie (c. 1473–1513), killed at the Battle of Flodden
William Douglas, 1st Earl of Queensberry (c. 1582–1640), Scottish nobleman
William Douglas, 2nd Lord Mordington (1626–after 1671)
Sir William Douglas of Kelhead (died 1673), Scottish colonel and Baronet of Nova Scotia
William Douglas, Duke of Hamilton (1634–1694)
William Douglas, 1st Duke of Queensberry (1637–1695), Scottish politician
William Douglas, 4th Duke of Queensberry (1724–1810), Scottish nobleman
Sir William Douglas, 4th Baronet (c. 1730–1783), MP for Dumfries Burghs
Sir William Douglas, 1st Baronet (died 1809), Scottish landowner and founder of Castle Douglas
Lord William Douglas (1783–1859), British politician and landowner
William Douglas, 1st Baron Douglas of Kirtleside (1893–1969), senior commander in the Royal Air Force

Arts
William Douglas (poet) (c. 1672–1748), Scottish writer, probable author of the poem "Annie Laurie"
William Douglas (painter) (1780–1832), Scottish miniature and portrait painter
William Fettes Douglas (1822–1881), Scottish painter
Billy Douglas (musician) (1912–1978), American jazz trumpeter and vocalist
Bill Douglas (1934–1991), Scottish film director
Bill Douglas (musician) (born 1944), Canadian musician
Billy Douglas (One Life to Live), fictional character on the television series One Life to Live

Military
William Douglas (colonel) (1742–1777), an American military officer during the American Revolutionary War.
Colonel Sir William Douglas of Balgillo (died 1818), a British Army officer during the Napoleonic Wars.
William Douglas (Major General) (1770–1834), a British Army officer in the War of 1812.
William Douglas (British Army officer, died 1920) (1858–1920), a British Army officer in the First World War.

Sports
William Douglas (cricketer, born 1848) (1848–1887), New Zealand cricketer
Billy Douglas (rugby union) (1863–1943), Welsh rugby union player
William Douglas (footballer), former Newton Heath and Blackpool footballer
William Douglas (footballer, born 1890) (1890–1917), Scottish footballer
Bill Douglas (rugby union) (born c. 1898), rugby union player who represented Australia
William Douglas (cricketer, born 1903) (1903–1981), New Zealand cricketer
William J. Douglas (footballer), Played for Montrose, Brechin City, Blackburn Rovers, Dick, Kerr's XI and Rochdale in the 1930s
William Douglas (boxer) (1940–1999), American boxer

Others
William Douglas, 14th of Cavers  (c. 1688–1748), Scottish landowner and politician, MP for Roxburghshire 1715–22, 1727–34, 1742–47, and for Dumfries Burghs 1722–27
William Douglas of Kirkness (1688–1747), British Army officer and politician
William Douglas (sea captain) (died 1791), Scottish and American maritime fur trader
William Douglas (died 1821) (1784–1821), advocate and British Member of Parliament for Plympton Erle 1812–16
William Douglas (priest) (died 1819), Archdeacon of Wilts, 1799–1804
William Bloomfield Douglas (1822–1906), Australian public servant and naval officer
William Lewis Douglas (1845–1924), governor of Massachusetts, 1905–1906
William H. Douglas (1853–1944), U.S. Representative from New York
William O. Douglas (1898–1980), United States Supreme Court justice
William O. Douglas, American who in 1878 received a patent for a lenticular truss bridge
Sir William Randolph Douglas (1921–2003), Chief Justice of Barbados
William Douglas (Northern Ireland politician) (born 1921), Orangeman and Assembly member
William Douglas (Canadian politician), representative from New Brunswick
Billy Douglas (politician), unionist activist from Northern Ireland
William Douglas Campbell, lobbyist and FBI informant

See also
Douglas baronets
William Douglass (disambiguation)